Carlin is a small city located near the western border of Elko County in northeast Nevada,  west of the city of Elko. It is part of the Elko Micropolitan Statistical Area. As of the 2010 census, its population was 2,368, up from 2,161 at the 2000 census. The city was named for Civil War general William Passmore Carlin. Its slogan is "Where the Train Stops...And the Gold Rush Begins".

Geography

To the northwest is the Carlin Trend, one of the most productive gold mining areas in the United States.

Climate

Demographics

As of the census of 2000, there were 2,161 people, 792 households, and 579 families residing in the city. The population density was 234.6 people per square mile (90.6/km). There were 1,014 housing units at an average density of 110.1 per square mile (42.5/km). The racial makeup of the city was 91.90% White, 0.05% African American, 1.76% Native American, 0.60% Asian, 0.05% Pacific Islander, 3.79% from other races, and 1.85% from two or more races. Hispanic or Latino of any race were 8.38% of the population.

There were 792 households, out of which 39.3% had children under the age of 18 living with them, 58.6% were married couples living together, 7.1% had a female householder with no husband present, and 26.8% were non-families. 21.6% of all households were made up of individuals, and 5.8% had someone living alone who was 65 years of age or older. The average household size was 2.73 and the average family size was 3.17.

In the city, the population was spread out, with 30.8% under the age of 18, 7.4% from 18 to 24, 31.1% from 25 to 44, 23.5% from 45 to 64, and 7.3% who were 65 years of age or older. The median age was 34 years. For every 100 females, there were 108.8 males. For every 100 females age 18 and over, there were 114.3 males.

The median income for a household in the city was $49,571, and the median income for a family was $51,716. Males had a median income of $47,396 versus $21,813 for females. The per capita income for the city was $19,377. About 4.1% of families and 7.8% of the population were below the poverty line, including 10.2% of those under age 18 and 3.0% of those age 65 or over.

History
On August 12, 1939, the City of San Francisco train derailed while crossing a bridge near Carlin, killing 24 and injuring 121. The wreck appeared to have been caused by sabotage but remains unsolved to this day. The train was operated by a joint partnership of the Chicago and North Western Railway, the Southern Pacific Railroad, and the Union Pacific Railroad.

Carlin was the home of the Native American medicine man John "Rolling Thunder" Pope (1916–1997), who had worked as a brakeman on the railway.

Education
Carlin has a public library, a branch of the Elko-Lander-Eureka County Library System.

Government
Carlin uses a city council with five councilpeople, including the mayor of the city. As of February 2020, the current mayor of Carlin is Dana Holbrook.

See also

 Carlin Tunnel
 Gold mining in Nevada
 Newmont Mining Corporation has a large gold-mining operation near Carlin

References

External links

 City of Carlin official website

Cities in Elko County, Nevada
Cities in Nevada
Elko, Nevada micropolitan area